Landsting elections were held in Denmark on 21 September 1906.

Of the twelve constituencies the seats representing constituencies number 1 (the city of Copenhagen), number 2 (Copenhagen County, Frederiksborg County and Holbæk County), number 4 (Bornholm County), number 7 (Hjørring County and Aalborg County) and number 9 (Aarhus County, Randers County and parts of Viborg County) were up for election.

Results

References

Elections in Denmark
Denmark
Landsting
Denmark